Juci Komlós (10 February 1919 – 5 April 2011) was a Hungarian film actress. She is best known for her performance as Lenke Takács in Szomszédok.

References

External links
 

1919 births
2011 deaths
Actors from Subotica
Hungarian film actresses